Ueda Glacier is a large glacier flowing eastward along the south side of the Scaife Mountains to enter Hansen Inlet near the base of Antarctic Peninsula.  It was mapped by United States Geological Survey (USGS) from surveys and U.S. Navy air photos from 1961 to 1967 and named by Advisory Committee on Antarctic Names (US-ACAN) for Herbert T. Ueda who, with B. Lyle Hansen, was in charge of the deep core drilling program at Byrd Station, summers 1966-67 and 1967–68.

Glaciers of Palmer Land